Biturix diversipes is a moth of the family Erebidae. It was described by Francis Walker in 1855. It is found in Venezuela.

References

Phaegopterina
Moths described in 1855